Most Haunted Live is a spin-off of the paranormal reality television series Most Haunted and was also produced by Antix Productions. The show consists of paranormal investigations broadcast live over a period of one or more nights, usually with interactive sections that involve the viewer.

Following a five-year hiatus, Most Haunted Live returned to our screens, this time on UKTV's Really on 31 October 2015. Most Haunted Live was back on 31 October 2019, Hallowe'en Night, exclusive to the official YouTube channel.

Production
The first episode of Most Haunted Live! was broadcast on Living on 31 October 2002, from Dudley Castle and was produced jointly by Antix and Hanrahan Media. The format of the show under this joint venture was different from Most Haunted, with different music cues and production style. The next seven live events were produced by Hanrahan. From the 2004 Summer Solstice live event onwards, the Most Haunted Live events were produced by Antix with the production style overhauled to ensure the live events had the same production style as the recorded series.

The first Most Haunted Live! show aired for only one night but over time this increased to three. The first exception was the Halloween 2005 show in London, which was broadcast for three nights. Since then there have been live shows which have lasted five nights (Halloween 2007 & Turin 2008), seven nights (Halloween 2008 and Liverpool 2009) and eight nights (Lancashire Halloween 2009). Gothic Prague – The Evil Within was on for four nights.

Most Haunted Live! did not return for Halloween 2010 and was replaced by a new paranormal show called Paranormal Investigation: LIVE! which aired for two nights on Sky Living.

In 2011 it was reported that Living, who were now known as Sky Living, had chosen not to re-commission either Most Haunted or Most Haunted Live! but thanked both Yvette Fielding and her husband Karl Beattie for their hard work and commitment over the years.

Most Haunted Live returned after a five-year hiatus on Saturday 31 October 2015 on the UKTV channel "Really" for a Halloween special. The three and a half hour live event aired from 9.00pm-12.30am GMT on the Really channel which is available in the UK and Ireland on satellite and cable services, as well as Freeview in the UK. The one night live event came from an allegedly haunted house at 30 East Drive, Pontefract in West Yorkshire, England.  The house was the scene for a previous investigation by the Most Haunted team for the series which aired a few weeks before this Halloween event. The team thought the house had a lot of paranormal activity, and it would merit being an ideal location for their first Most Haunted Live in five years.

The live event was hosted by Rylan Clark-Neal and Jamie East who presented from an outside broadcast unit and a small outside studio, with the usual members of the Most Haunted team present too, including Yvette Fielding, Karl Beattie and Stuart Torevell, the only three original members left of the Most Haunted Live team. The live event had the usual interaction from the general public who could tweet or Facebook in their comments and who could watch live streaming webcams from different areas in the house. Talk show host and personality Paul O'Grady joined the team in the investigation.

The event caused some controversy when it appeared that Karl Beattie was dragged up the stairs of the house by an "invisible" force. However reviewing back footage of the incident, many viewers and sceptics noted that Karl had what appeared to be a rope or cable around his waist which dragged him up the stairs. Karl and his wife Yvette dispute the claims that this was a faked incident, saying that the cable around Karl was just a camera lead. Karl would later make a YouTube video explaining the incident and answer sceptics' questions. The disappearance and later reappearance of a knife also caused concern, as many sceptics felt this was staged too. The Most Haunted team deny all claims of fakery or staged events during the Halloween live special.

It was confirmed by Yvette Fielding and the Really Channel that for Halloween 2016 there would not be a live event, but an "As Live" event to air on the UKTV Play platform, their on demand video site. On Monday 31 October 2016 from 9.00pm-11.00pm, Most Haunted will air an "as live" recorded edition of the show from HMP Shrewsbury on UKTV Play. The edition will have no edits and it will be a two-hour investigation recorded as live. The episode will also air on the Really Channel on Thursday 3 November 2016 at 10.00pm for those who could not see it on UKTV Play.

In a recorded promo for the upcoming Halloween special, Yvette said it will be two hours of "pure uncut Most Haunted terror", as Yvette and the team return to HMP Shrewsbury, a place where the team had investigated before in the previous series. It was a place where some unexplained paranormal activities had occurred including a crow bar being thrown and her husband Karl Beattie collapsing on the floor. She had said she never wanted to return there again, but for Halloween, she decided the location was perfect for another investigation.

The Live show returned on Hallowe'en night 2019 on the Most Haunted Official YouTube Channel, for a 3-hour event from Accrington Police Station and Courts.

The team
This table shows a list of the current team members and their role in the live shows.
Most of these are investigators and are part of the investigation team on location, whereas others are based in the hub.

Arch Dyson was the editor in this Living TV series.

Following the return of the main show Most Haunted on a new freeview channel called Really (TV channel) in 2014, it was decided by Antix Productions that psychic mediums would not be used in the format. It is understood this will also follow through to the Most Haunted Live! episode on 31 October 2015.

Format
The live events were based on specific paranormal themes, the two most common themes being Halloween and the summer solstice which are reputedly the two most paranormally active periods of the calendar. Some themes are based on well known historical figures such as Dick Turpin, William Shakespeare, Jack the Ripper and Dracula. Other themes include Pirates Curse a live event which took place over a weekend in May 2007. For Halloween 2007, the team embarked on a five night investigation. They traveled around the country in the shape of an inverted pentagram. For Halloween 2008, the Most Haunted Live team undertook a record seven night investigation in the Welsh town on Denbigh, investigating the disused Asylum in the village.  A further seven night investigation is taking place over a week in January 2009 in Liverpool, where the team investigate each night a different aspect of the paranormal.

"The Hub", as it was known, was the centre of communications where the audience and main studio were set up. The presenters, Paul Ross and David Bull, historian, Lesley Smith followed by Dr John Callow, and 'demonologist' Fred Batt who resides in Capel, Surrey worked from the hub. He owned Caesars Nightclub in Streatham from 1994 to 2010. As did the interactive team and its leader, Julian Clegg. The hub was also the location of the gallery and production offices.

The show was fully interactive. There were usually four webcams running through the event which could be watched online. Viewers could also send emails and text messages to report their own experiences.

Episodes

2002

2003

2004

2005

2006

2007

2008

2009

2010

2015
Most Haunted Live returned in 2015 for its first live special since 2010. The live elements were presented by Rylan Clark and Jamie East. Paul O'Grady appeared as a guest at the event. The event was broadcast on the UKTV  channel Really and aired on 31 October 2015 from 9.00pm-12.30am GMT. The event came from 30 East Drive, Pontefract in West Yorkshire, England.

2016 
Following the 2015 live, the team aired a 2-hour long 2016 Halloween special in the style of a Most Haunted Live, except it was not live. Titled 'Most Haunted As Live', the 2-hour special came from HM Prison Shrewsbury. The show was unedited and uncut, showing the Most Haunted team returning to one of their most frightening paranormal locations to date.

The 2-hour long special was exclusively released on UKTV Play on 31 October 2016 and was aired on 3 November 2016 on Really.

2019 
Most Haunted Live returned on 30 June 2019 exclusive to the Most Haunted Official YouTube channel.

2020 
Following the COVID-19 Pandemic, a Most Haunted Live Special was presented at Accrington Courts where the Team speak about 2019's Halloween Live Special & showing a present 'As Live' footage at Accrington Courts unedited and uncut. Then followed with a few members of the team, sharing their memories of experience of the franchise of Most Haunted, with guest interviews & then followed by a feature-length episode of the planned secret location that was filmed before the Covid Pandemic. After the episode there were more interviews from the team about their experience at the secret location.

The 5 Hour special was exclusively released on YouTube.

2021 
Following the ongoing COVID-19 Pandemic, the Team returned with an audience since its last in Accrington in 2019.

The almost 3 Hour special was exclusively released on YouTube.

2022 
Most Haunted Live returned for a Halloween special, broadcast live from Delapré Abbey in Northamptonshire. The three hour live investigation was streamed live on the Most Haunted Official YouTube channel on Halloween night of Monday 31 October 2022 from 9pm G.M.T.

Live Series (2010) 
A Live Series of 'Most Haunted' was broadcast every Saturday on Living, live for two-hours. The Live Series ended on 13 March 2010, to make way for The next Most Haunted Live! event: Gothic Prague – The Evil Within.

Most Haunted Live! (USA) 2007
The following special live events were aired live in the US only as a 7 Hour Live Investigation. The UK aired a 2-hour edited version of the live events which were classed as the 'Almost' live series.

References

External links
 

2002 British television series debuts
2000s British reality television series
2010s British reality television series
Paranormal reality television series
Sky Living original programming
UKTV original programming
English-language television shows